MK-2206 is a drug candidate being investigated to help treat cancer. Its chemical formula is C25H21N5O. It acts as an allosteric AKT inhibitor.

It is a highly selective inhibitor of pan-Akt, namely, of all three Akt isoforms Akt1, Akt2, and Akt3.

It is intended to be used with other cancer therapies that advanced tumours may become resistant to.


Clinical trials
2011: A phase 1 clinical trial of MK-2206 alone has reported it was well tolerated.
2014: A phase 1 clinical trial of MK-2206 with a variety of other agents in 72 patients with advanced cancer reported acceptable side-effects.
2016: MK-2206 is one of the treatments in the I-SPY2 Adaptive clinical trial for breast cancer that had been selected for later stage trials.
 31 phase II clinical trials are registered, many completed. e.g. in colorectal cancer, breast cancer, and many others.

MK-2206 and COVID-19 
Data shown in a study preprint suggest that SARS-CoV-2 infection decreases cellular autophagy and that MK-2206, which induces autophagy, reduced virus replication by up to 88% in vitro. The study's authors propose that MK-2206 should be tested in clinical trials as a potential treatment for COVID-19.

References 

Protein kinase inhibitors
Experimental cancer drugs
Cyclobutanes
Amines
Nitrogen heterocycles
Heterocyclic compounds with 3 rings